Mutthanna is a 1994 Indian Kannada-language action drama film directed by M. S. Rajashekar and produced by L. Somanna Gowda. The movie stars Supriya, Shashi Kumar, and Shiva Rajkumar, playing two characters, in the leading roles.

The film is a remake of Manmohan Desai's Hindi film Sachaa Jhutha (1970). Shiva Rajkumar's eldest daughter made her only on-screen appearance in the movie, credited as Baby Nirupama Shiva Rajkumar. The film was re-released in digital format with 2K resolution & 7.1 surround sound in October 2017.

Cast 
 Shiva Rajkumar as Mutthanna/Kiran Kumar (double role)
 Supriya as Mutthu's lover
 Shashikumar as a Police Inspector
 Sneha as a child artist
 Thoogudeepa Srinivas
 Doddanna as a Police Constable
 M. N. Lakshmi Devi
 Bhavyashree Rai as Bhavani (Mutthu's sister)
 Girija Lokesh as Kiran's Mother
 Mynavathi
 Ashwath Narayan
 Honnavalli Krishna as a coffee boy who wants a cheque

https://chiloka.com/movie/mutthanna-1994

Mutthananna is a village simpleton, a good musician, and a poor orphan who lives with his physically impaired sister, Bhavani. Kiran Kumar, a.k.a Diamond Kiran, is Mutthu's lookalike. He is a billionaire wanted for theft and diamond smuggling. Mutthu meets Kiran Kumar in the city and is shocked to see the similarity. Kiran convinces Mutthu to stay with him, pretending he is his twin brother. After some time, Kiran reveals to Mutthu that he is a cancer patient and requires help for his business. Mutthu accepts this offer without being aware of Kiran's past. When Mutthu discovers the truth, Kiran threatens him by torturing Bhavani.

Soundtrack 
The soundtrack of the film was composed by Hamsalekha.

References 

1994 films
1990s action drama films
1990s Kannada-language films
Indian action drama films
Kannada remakes of Hindi films
Films scored by Hamsalekha
Films directed by M. S. Rajashekar
1994 drama films